The Jolly Nyame Stadium is a multi-use stadium in Jalingo, Nigeria.  It is currently used mostly for football matches and is home for Taraba FC. The stadium holds 12,000 people and was built in 2002. It was named after the then Executive Governor of the state, Hon. Jolly Nyame.

References 

External links
 Pictures 

Sports venues completed in 2002
Football venues in Nigeria
2002 establishments in Nigeria
21st-century architecture in Nigeria